Gunners Pond is a body of water located near Carbonear, Newfoundland and Labrador on the Avalon peninsula. It is accessible through a road from Carbonear and a bike trail connecting to Fox Farm Road. In the northwestern end of the pond, there is a section nicknamed "Tub's Harbour". It was nicknamed by local residents. There are 20 dwellings on the pond home to full-time residents and others are used as cabins.

Water flows into Gunners Pond from McCarthy's Pond and The Bower, while Gunners Pond flows into London Pond.

References

http://maps.google.ca/maps?hl=en&rlz=1C1GGGE_enUS378US378&q=gunners+pond+newfoundland&bav=on.2,or.r_gc.r_pw.&biw=725&bih=433&um=1&ie=UTF-8&hq=&hnear=0x4b734fcd4a22a769:0xe82701c54fe00ec,Gunners+Pond&gl=ca&ei=Dm7tTfmpIs3TgAeP6_nXCQ&sa=X&oi=geocode_result&ct=title&resnum=1&ved=0CBoQ8gEwAA

Lakes of Newfoundland and Labrador